The Arizona Diamondbacks are a Major League Baseball team based in Phoenix, Arizona. The Diamondbacks are part of the National League and play in the West Division.  Since beginning play in the 1998 season, the Diamondbacks called Chase Field (formerly named "Bank One Ballpark") their home. The name "Diamondbacks" was inspired by the Western diamondback snake and was chosen among thousands of entries in a contest to name the team.

Arizona made their Major League debut in the 1998 baseball season when they became the 14th expansion team. After going 65–97 in their first season, the Diamondbacks were the National League West Division Champions in the 1999 baseball season when they went 100–62.  They made it to the National League Division Series but they lost to the New York Mets. The early success of the franchise was exemplified in 2001 when the Diamondbacks defeated the New York Yankees in a dramatic seven game World Series in 2001. In the 2002 baseball season, Arizona returned to the playoffs but were defeated by the St. Louis Cardinals in the National League Division Series. Post season baseball did not return to the desert until the 2007 season when Arizona lost to the Colorado Rockies in the National League Championship Series. The following season, Arizona narrowly missed the playoffs, when they finished 2 games behind the Los Angeles Dodgers. In 2011, the Diamondbacks won their division but were ousted by the Milwaukee Brewers in the National League Division Series. In 2017, the Arizona Diamondbacks finished 2nd in the NL West, and they played in the National League Wild Card Game against the Rockies. This would be the team's first appearance in the postseason as a Wild Card team. Arizona won 11–8 and played the Dodgers in the NLDS that year but were swept in 3 games.

Table Key

Regular season results

These statistics are current as of October 5, 2022. Bold denotes a playoff season, pennant or championship; italics  denote an active season.

Record by decade 
The following table describes the Diamondbacks' MLB win–loss record by decade.

These statistics are from Baseball-Reference.com's Arizona Diamondbacks History & Encyclopedia, and are current as of October 5, 2022.

Post-season record by year
The Diamondbacks have made the postseason six times in their history, with their first being in 1999 and the most recent being in 2017.

See also
 Arizona Diamondbacks team records
 List of Arizona Diamondbacks Opening Day starting pitchers
 Managers and ownership of the Arizona Diamondbacks

References

 
Major League Baseball teams seasons
Seasons